Francisco de Asís Tárrega Eixea (21 November 185215 December 1909) was a Spanish composer and classical guitarist of the late Romantic period. He is known for such pieces as Capricho Árabe and Recuerdos de la Alhambra. He is often called "the father of classical guitar" and is considered one of the greatest guitarists of all time.

Biography
Tárrega was born on 21 November 1852, in Villarreal, Province of Castellón, Spain. It is said that Francisco's father played flamenco and several other music styles on his guitar; when his father was away working as a watchman at the Convent of San Pascual, Francisco would take his father's guitar and attempt to make the beautiful sounds he had heard. Francisco's nickname as a child was "Quiquet".

As a child, he ran away from his nanny and fell into an irrigation channel and injured his eyes. Fearing that his son might lose his sight completely, his father moved the family to Castellón de la Plana to attend music classes because as a musician he would be able to earn a living, even if blind. Both his first music teachers, Eugeni Ruiz and Manuel González, were blind.

In 1862, concert guitarist Julián Arcas, on tour in Castellón, heard the young Tárrega play and advised Tárrega's father to allow Francisco to come to Barcelona to study with him. Tárrega's father agreed, but insisted that his son take piano lessons as well. The guitar was viewed as an instrument to accompany singers, while the piano was quite popular throughout Europe. However, Tárrega had to stop his lessons shortly after, when Arcas left for a concert tour abroad. Although Tárrega was only ten years old, he ran away and tried to start a musical career on his own by playing in coffee houses and restaurants in Barcelona. He was soon found and brought back to his father, who had to make great sacrifices to advance his son's musical education.

Three years later, in 1865, he ran away again, this time to Valencia where he joined a family of gypsies. His father looked for him and brought him back home once more, but he ran away a third time, again to Valencia. By his early teens, Tárrega was proficient on both the piano and the guitar. For a time, he played with other musicians at local engagements to earn money, but eventually he returned home to help his family.

Tárrega entered the Madrid Royal Conservatory in 1874, under the sponsorship of a wealthy merchant named Antonio Canesa. He had brought along with him a recently purchased guitar, made in Seville by Antonio de Torres. Its superior sonic qualities inspired him both in his playing and in his view of the instrument's compositional potential. At the conservatory, Tárrega studied composition under Emilio Arrieta who convinced him to focus on guitar and abandon the idea of a career with the piano.

By the end of the 1870s, Tárrega was teaching the guitar (Emilio Pujol, Miguel Llobet, and Daniel Fortea were pupils of his) and giving regular concerts. Tárrega received much acclaim for his playing and began traveling to other areas of Spain to perform. By this time he was composing his first works for guitar, which he played in addition to works of other composers.

During the winter of 1880, Tárrega replaced his friend Luis de Soria, in a concert in Novelda, Alicante, where, after the concert, an important man in town asked the artist to listen to his daughter, María José Rizo, who was learning to play guitar. Soon they were engaged.

In 1881, Tárrega played in the Opera Theatre in Lyon and then the Paris Odeon, in the bicentenary of the death of Pedro Calderón de la Barca. He also played in London, but he liked neither the language nor the weather. There is a story about his visit to England. After a concert, some people saw that the musician was in low spirits. "What is the matter, maestro?" they asked him. "Do you miss home? Your family, perhaps?" They advised him to capture that moment of sadness in his music. Thus he conceived the theme of one of his most memorable works, Lágrima (literally meaning teardrop). After playing in London he returned to Novelda for his wedding. At Christmas 1882, Tárrega married María José Rizo.

To enlarge his guitar repertory and to make use of his considerable knowledge of keyboard music, he soon began transcribing piano works of Beethoven, Chopin, Mendelssohn and others. Tárrega and his wife moved to Madrid, gaining their living by teaching privately and playing concerts, but after the death of an infant daughter during the winter, Maria Josefa de los Angeles Tárrega Rizo, they settled permanently in Barcelona in 1885. Among his friends in Barcelona were Isaac Albéniz, Enrique Granados, Joaquín Turina and Pau Casals.

Francisco Tárrega and María José (María Josefa) Rizo had three more children: Paquito (Francisco), Maria Rosatia (María Rosalia) (best known as Marieta) and Concepción. On a concert tour in Valencia shortly afterward, Tárrega met the wealthy Concepción Gómez de Jacoby, who became a valuable patron to him. She allowed him and his family use of part of her house outside Barcelona. Later she took him to Granada, which later inspired the guitarist to write Recuerdos de la Alhambra, which he first dedicated to Concepción in 1899 with the title "A Granada." He later dedicated a revised published version of this piece to Alfred Cottin, the French guitarist he had met in Paris while participating in a concert on a visit accompanied and almost certainly sponsored by Gómez de Jacoby.

From the later 1880s up to 1903, Tárrega continued composing and traveling, but limited his concerts to Spain. In 1900, Tárrega visited Algiers, where he was said to have heard a repetitive rhythm played on an Arabian drum and the following morning composed Danza Mora based on that rhythm. In about 1902, he cut his fingernails and created a sound that would become typical of those guitarists later associated with his school. The following year he went on tour to Italy, performing in Rome, Naples, and Milan.

In January 1906, he was afflicted with paralysis on his right side, and though he would eventually return to performing, he never completely recovered. He finished his last work, Oremus, on 2 December 1909. He died in Barcelona thirteen days later, on 15 December, at the age of 57.

Musical style

Tárrega composed music in the romantic style of 19th-century European masters. His conservatory training and familiarity with contemporary classical genres and techniques are apparent in his compositions and transcriptions; these are more sophisticated than those of Spanish guitarist-composers of the previous generation and his contemporaries, e.g., Magín Alegre, Tomás Damas, Julián Arcas, José Viñas, and José Ferrer.

A virtuoso on his instrument, he was known as the "Sarasate of the guitar," although Tárrega preferred small intimate performances over the concert stage.

Tárrega is considered to have laid the foundations for 20th-century classical guitar and for increasing interest in the guitar as a recital instrument.

Compositions 

Although only 19 original compositions were published in his lifetime, Francisco Tárrega composed approximately 80 original pieces and 120 transcriptions – mostly for his own use and that of his students. The exact number has yet to be determined. Most of his later published works were edited by others, and often altered. His favored genres were character pieces (several with Spanish, 'Moorish' and "Arabic" allusions) including preludes, etudes, caprices, serenatas, exotic dances, mazurkas, waltzes, and 'ancient dances' also favored by his contemporaries Isaac Albéniz and Enrique Granados (e.g., gavota, minuetto, and pavana).

He transcribed many works from the piano (he was a capable keyboard player), violin and especially the operatic repertory. 
As with several of his Spanish contemporaries, such as his friend Isaac Albéniz, he had an interest in combining the prevailing romantic style in classical music with Spanish folk elements, and transcribed several of Albéniz's piano pieces. The contemporary guitarist and composer Angelo Gilardino has written that Tárrega's 9 Preludios are "... the deepest musical thought of Tárrega in the most concentrated form."

He is also the composer of Gran Vals, an excerpt of which was used in the Nokia tune, the default ringtone of Nokia phones. It appears on these phones in a variety of different styles and instrumentations; for example, phones from 2002 to 2007 include piano-based renditions, while phones released during 2008 to 2010 feature a folk-inspired guitar rendition.

Guitars
The guitars used by Tárrega include:

 Enrique Garcia, n°74 (1906) - This instrument was gifted by Tárrega to his friend Alfred Cottin, to whom he dedicated the composition Recuerdos de la Alhambra. It then became the official guitar of 'Les Amis de la Guitare', a circle of Parisian guitarists, where it was played by Django Reinhardt, among others. In 2019 Kyuhee Park recorded a video of Recuerdos de la Alhambra on this guitar. (See External Link)
Torres, FE 17 (1869) – This is the guitar that was given to 17 year old Francisco Tárrega by Torres personally after hearing him play.
Torres, SE 49 (1883)
Torres, SE 114 (1888); in the collection of Sheldon Urlik

Notes

References
Diccionario biográfico–bibliográfico—histórico: crítico de guitarras (instrumentos afines), guitarristas (profesores–compositores–concertistas–lahudistas–amateurs), guitarreros (luthiers). Danzas y cantos—terminología by Domingo Prat  (Buenos Aires: Romero y Fernández [1934]
Tárrega. Ensayo biográfico by Emilio Pujol (Lisboa: Talleres Gráficos de Ramos, Afonso & Moita, L.D.A., 1960/ Valencia: Artes Gráficas Soler. S.A., 1978).
Francisco Tárrega Biografía Oficial by Adrián Rius Espinós, published by Ayuntamiento de Vila-Real, 
Concepción Gómez de Jacoby: Tárrega’s Enigmatic Patron and Recuerdos de la Alhambra by David J. Buch (http://michaelorenz.blogspot.com/2020/11/concepcion-gomez-de-jacoby-tarregas.html)
Francisco Tárrega – Selección de Obras by Adrián Rius Espinós (includes CD with historical recordings by Josefina Robledo; example: "Capricho árabe", published by Excmo. Ayuntamiento de Vila-Real and Instituto Valenciano de la Música
Francisco Tárrega, Werden und Wirkung by Wolf Moser, published by Edition Saint-Georges. .
Francisco Tárrega, Complete Guitar Works by Michel Beauchamp, edited by Productions d'Oz. 
Francisco Tárrega y la guitarra en Espana entre 1830 y 1960 by Wolf Moser, published by Piles Editorial de Música S.A. 
Francisco Tárrega, Collected Guitar Works, reprints of early editions, by Rafael Andia, Chanterelle 1001 and 1002.

External links 

 

Free Scores and biography
Complete work and biography (with MIDI music files, that are not at all reflective of Tárrega's performance style, but instead of sheetmusic)
Tárrega / Walter Leckie Manuscripts, www.theguitarmuseum.com
Francisco Tárrega and Música by Carmen Copovi Llop 
Photos from Francisco Tárrega's room in the Vila-real City Museum
Monument in Vila-Real
 by Salvador Carracedo Benet 
"Kyuhee Park | Recuerdos de la Alhambra (F. Tárrega)"

1852 births
1909 deaths
19th-century classical composers
19th-century guitarists
19th-century Spanish composers
19th-century Spanish male musicians
20th-century classical composers
20th-century guitarists
20th-century Spanish composers
20th-century Spanish male musicians
Blind classical musicians
Composers for the classical guitar
Composers from the Valencian Community
People from Villarreal
Spanish classical composers
Spanish classical guitarists
Spanish male classical composers
Spanish male guitarists
Spanish Romantic composers